Friederike Roth (born 6 April 1948) is a German writer. She is especially active as a playwright.

Roth was born in Sindelfingen. She won the City of Stuttgart Literary Prize in 1982 and the Ingeborg Bachmann Prize in 1983.

References

1948 births
Living people
People from Sindelfingen
Ingeborg Bachmann Prize winners
German women dramatists and playwrights
20th-century German dramatists and playwrights
21st-century German dramatists and playwrights
21st-century German women writers
20th-century German women writers